Sarah Corbett is a speaker, professional activist, author and the founder of Craftivist Collective, a social enterprise which uses the technique of craftivism - combining craft and activism  - to engage people in social justice issues "in a quiet, non-confrontational manner involving pretty, handcrafted gestures of defiance."

She wrote A Little Book of Craftivism which was published in 2013, and How To Be A Craftivist, published in 2017.

Craftivism 
Corbett has "a huge passion for craft". She has no formal training as an artist or craftsperson, saying "I can do it anyone can do it." Her main craft is cross-stitch, which she often uses to make mini-protest banners. She has described her work as using "creativity to make the public aware of the struggles people are still going through".

Work by Sarah Corbett has been exhibited and sold in art exhibitions including:
 'Article 31.1' at Workshop 44.
 'Renegade Potters and Extreme Craft' at Ink_d.
 'Riot Here, Riot Now' at W3 Gallery.
 'Spoken Threads' in New York and Los Angeles.
 'Gentle Protest' in Stockholm.

She has spoken about craftivism at various TedX meetups, Salon London, Lost Lectures, Sunday Wise at The Ivy, the Victoria and Albert Museum and at Women's Institutes.

She has also given guest lectures at Parsons The New School for Design and Leeds College of Art, participated in a project with Falmouth University and has been a Twitter chair and guest blogger for the British Museum. She is a columnist for Crafty Magazine and MrXStitch.com and blogs regularly for Campaign Central.

Corbett was featured on Stitched Stories, a documentary by Northern Productions.
She was also a panellist discussing 'Not Knowing' for the Lush Speakeasy podcast.

Corbett's 2016 talk Activism Needs Introverts was featured on the TED homepage in November 2017 and has generated over 1 million views since.

Background 
Corbett grew up in West Everton in Liverpool in the 1980s, when it was one of the most deprived wards in the UK. Her mother is a local councillor in Liverpool and her father is a vicar. Her parents have been a big influence on Corbett's politics, for example by taking her to South Africa as a child and on protests to save local housing from demolition. She has said "All we ever do around the kitchen table is talk about religion and politics."

At school Corbett was voted Head Girl and successfully campaigned for lockers for students. She studied at the University of Manchester where she was active in numerous campaign groups. After graduating she took a course on grassroots community action based on the work of Steve Biko. She went on to work for various international charities in their youth and community programmes and campaigns departments, including Christian Aid and the Department for International Development. In 2011 she worked on campaigns for Oxfam in London. In 2012 she went part-time at Oxfam to devote more time to the Craftivist Collective.

Corbett is a Christian who says faith plays a role in her craftivism and that she has "learnt to act out my faith rather than just talk about it".

One of Corbett's most distinctive features is her tattooed arms, which include a pair of scissors wrapped in thread, a sewing needle, measuring tape, and safety pins. The 'craft tattoos' remind her of "what I do and why and to make sure I keep going."

References

External links 

 Vida, Obra y Libros usados de Sarah-Corbett
 Craftivist Collective website

21st-century English women writers
British women activists
English Christians
English human rights activists
English women artists
Living people
Oxfam people
People associated with the University of Manchester
People from Everton
Textile artists
Women human rights activists
Women textile artists
Year of birth missing (living people)